Daftuh is a town and Union Council of Kasur District in the Punjab province of Pakistan. It is part of Kasur Tehsil and is located at 31°15'0N 74°22'60E with an altitude of 197 metres (649 feet).

Neighbourhood Villages
East side Mustafabad (lalyani)
Wet side satoky 
South side Panodoky and Gulvera
North side orara village
Entraning from east (Mustafabad) first chowk known as qaichi (scissor), before qainchi chowk right road goes to shehere khamoshan (graveyard)

References

Kasur District
Union councils of Kasur District